Alice Guszalewicz (21 September 1879 – 26 October 1940) was a Hungarian dramatic soprano.

Biography

Guszalewicz was born in Budapest, and in 1896, at the age of seventeen, married opera singer Eugen Guszalewicz. She studied with her husband and made her debut in 1903 at the Theater of Bern, in Switzerland. In 1905, she sang at the Cologne Opera as the Queen of Sheba in La reine de Saba by Gounod, and as Isolde in Wagner's masterpiece. Shortly after her role in Tristan, she was offered a six-year contract to sing in Cologne.

Guszalewicz continued to sing in Cologne until 1916 and toured throughout Europe. She also sang in several operas and gave recitals in Karlsruhe (1906), Düsseldorf (1907), Bremen (1908) and Dresden (1908). In Dresden at the Semperoper, she performed the title role in Salome for the first time. Her interpretation of Salome caused a sensation.

For many years, however, a picture of her performance was thought to in fact show the play's author, Wilde in women's drag. The picture was even reproduced in Richard Ellmann's biography of him. It was not until Wilde's grandson Merlin Holland corrected scholars in 1994 that the picture in fact showed Guszalewicz. This correction undermined readings of Wilde as a cross-dresser.

She performed at the Leipzig Opera (1908), at the Vienna State Opera (1910 in the role of Salome), at the Berlin State Opera (1911 as Brünnhilde and as Isolde), as well as in Brussels, Paris and Madrid. In 1905, she sang the lead role in Isidore de Lara's opera Messaline in Cologne, which was a great success for her. The opera had 27 performances.

Guszalewicz gave concerts at the opera in Frankfurt am Main (1907), at the  Stadttheater of Bremen (1908) and at the National Theatre Munich (1910 as Salome). Her repertoire included the roles of Leonore in Fidelio, Adriano in Rienzi, Venus in Tannhäuser, the title role of Ingwelde in Max von Schillings' opera, Elektra (opera) in the opera of Richard Strauss, Berthe in Le prophète by Meyerbeer, Santuzza in Cavalleria Rusticana, the title role in Mascagni's Amica, and Maria in A basso porto by Niccola Spinelli.

After ending her career, she worked as a teacher in Munich. Her daughter Genia Guszalewicz (1902–71) became one of her students, and she followed her mother into a career as an opera singer.

Alice Guszalewicz died at the age of 61 in Munich, Germany.

Media

References

External links

 Alice Guszalewicz article in German
 The Importance of Not Being Salome
 Alice Guszalewicz cylinder recordings, from the UCSB Cylinder Audio Archive at the University of California, Santa Barbara Library.

1879 births
1940 deaths
Hungarian operatic sopranos
20th-century Hungarian women opera singers
Musicians from Budapest
Women opera singers from the Austro-Hungarian Empire